Prairie Lea is an unincorporated community in Caldwell County, Texas, United States. According to the Handbook of Texas, the community had an estimated population of 255 in 2000. It is part of the Austin–Round Rock Metropolitan Statistical Area.

History
The community, Caldwell County's oldest, was built on the 1820 land grant of Joe Martin of Gonzales. Sam Houston named the town for his future wife Margaret Lea Houston. Edmund Bellinger, a veteran of the Battle of San Jacinto and Battle of Plum Creek, became Prairie Lea's first settler in 1839. Other early settlers were largely slave-holding families. Growth followed the establishment of a sawmill, gristmill, and gin by Thomas Mooney on the nearby San Marcos River. The remains of this dam can still be seen today. James Hugh Callihan opened the first store in the community in 1849. By 1853, there was a hotel, two stores, and a post office in Prairie Lea. During the Civil War, men from Prairie Lea served with John Bell Hood's Texas Brigade and joined forces with an army in northern Virginia and took part in the ill-fated Sibley Campaign in New Mexico Territory. Members of that expedition who were either starving or stranded were brought back to their homes by a community committee that had organized wagons, mules, harnesses, food, and supplies for the mission in June 1862. A gristmill called Mooney gristmill paid for other food supplies by a special county tax and donations to the families living in Caldwell County made destitute by the war. Hardship in the community was caused by reconstruction. Nothing could stop violence in the community, not even the stationing of troops nor appeals to the Freedmen's Bureau. Some families living in the community moved to Mexico. Peace and prosperity did come back to the community by the 1870s, but an 1877 fire destroyed the community's business district, which contained 17 stores.  By 1884, Prairie Lea had a population of 100 with gristmills, cotton gins, and two churches. It eventually shipped cotton. By 1914, the number of residents had grown to 350 and had three general stores and two blacksmith shops. Development of the nearby Luling oilfield during the 1920s caused an increase in Prairie Lea's population.  During the latter half of the twentieth century, the population slowly declined. By 1990, Prairie Lea was home to 100 residents. That number had risen to 255 in 2000 with five small businesses and two churches operating in the community. Its population shrunk to 100 in 2010.

Although Prairie Lea is unincorporated, it has a post office, with the ZIP Code of 78661.

On September 18, 2018, an 18-year-old student was arrested and charged with making terroristic threats towards a student and Prairie Lea School, as well as evading arrest.

Geography
Prairie Lea is situated along State Highway 80 in southwestern Caldwell County, approximately six miles northwest of Luling and ten miles southwest of Lockhart near the San Marcos River. The nearest major city is Austin, located 44 miles to the north. San Marcos is located 20 miles northeast.

Education
The community's first school was organized in a log cabin in 1848 and was used for church services as well. A charter school called Prairie Lea Academy was established by a Masonic order in 1852 and then a school for girls called Prairie Lea Female Institute opened in 1860. It had a school in 1853 and another school was built by the Grange in 1878. Another school was established in 1890. A five-room school building was constructed in 1925. Higher enrollment caused the school to add five new classrooms the following year. By the 1940s, students in nearby Fentress and Stairtown attended the school. It was still the focus of community life in 1990 and was classified as a cooperative educational effort.

Today, Prairie Lea, including Fentress and Stairtown, are all served by the Prairie Lea Independent School District. There is only one campus, Prairie Lea School, and it serves students in grades Pre-kindergarten through twelfth. It is home to the Prairie Lea Indians.

Notable person
 Scott H. Biram, musician, was raised in the community.

Gallery

References

Unincorporated communities in Caldwell County, Texas
Unincorporated communities in Texas
Greater Austin